"Box of Rain" is a song by the Grateful Dead, from their 1970 album American Beauty. The song was composed by bassist Phil Lesh and lyricist Robert Hunter, and sung by Lesh. In later years, the song was a favorite and the crowd would shout "Let Phil sing!" to hear the song.

The song
 Key: G
 Time signature: 4/4 (with an occasional 2/4 measure)
 Chords used: A, Bm7/A, A4, D, Am, Em, C, G, Bm

"Box of Rain" is a song that is drawn from American folk and country musical roots.  This is true of many Grateful Dead tunes, and most of the songs on American Beauty and their other 1970 release Workingman's Dead. As the first song on American Beauty, it was also the first Grateful Dead song released on record to feature Phil Lesh as the lead vocalist.

The song also featured two musicians who are not in the band.  Dave Torbert played bass, while Lesh played acoustic guitar. David Nelson (of New Riders of the Purple Sage) plays the lead guitar with a Fender Telecaster, while Jerry Garcia plays the piano. While many describe Dave Nelson's Telecaster solo as being performed on a b-bender equipped guitar, the solo was recorded before he owned one, and was performed using traditional bending technique. Bob Weir sings harmony with Lesh and Garcia.

Lyrics
According to lyricist Hunter, Lesh "wanted a song to sing to his dying father and had composed a piece complete with every vocal nuance but the words. If ever a lyric 'wrote itself,' this did – as fast as the pen would pull." Lesh practiced the song driving to the nursing home where his father lay with terminal cancer.

According to an interview of Hunter by Steve Silberman, as asked by Silberman, "The song 'Box of Rain' began as a rough vocal outline from Phil Lesh. How does that process work?" Hunter replied, "Scat singing: Dum-dum dum, da-da-da-da, bump-dum-dum-dum-dum, dee-dee-dee. I'm able to translate people's scat. I hear English in it, almost as though I write down what I hear underneath that. I hear the intention. It's a talent like the Rubik's Cube, or something like that, and it comes easily to me. Which might be why I like language poetry. I can tell from the rhythms, or lack of rhythms, from the disjunctures and the end stoppages, what they're avoiding saying – the meaning that they would like to not be stating there, comes rushing through to me. I understand dogs. I can talk to babies."

Many of the lyrics to this song are reminiscent of the song "Ripple", which opens the second side of the album.  Images of water abound in both, as well as references to "broken" or "hand-me-down" thoughts. According to Hunter: "By 'box of rain,' I meant the world we live on, but 'ball' of rain didn't have the right ring to my ear, so box it became, and 'I don't know who put it there.'"

The line "moth before a flame" echoes several proverbs, such as "the fate of the moth in the flame"—Aeschylus, Fragments (Fragment #288). The line "long long time to be gone and a short time to be there" echoes the old-time classic "Little Birdie", which includes the line "I've a short while to be here, and a long time to be gone."

In one of Carl Hiaasen's novels, the main character is in a shelter for children stranded by a hurricane, and in a particularly tender moment, sings "Box of Rain" to the child.

Performance history
"Box of Rain" debuted on September 17, 1970, at the Fillmore East in New York City during the acoustic portion of the show.  That performance was (perhaps significantly given the song's emotional burden for Lesh) its sole appearance for nearly two years. The Grateful Dead reintroduced it during the fall of 1972 and played it on and off for the remainder of the year and 1973 before dropping it again.

Between 1976 and 1985, Lesh seldom sang with the group (confining his contributions to harmony vocals on "Truckin'") due to vocal cord damage from improper singing. Over 750 concerts after its last performance, "Box of Rain" was permanently revived on March 20, 1986 at the Coliseum in Hampton, Virginia. After that, the song was frequently played in response to chants from the audience. Before the death of Jerry Garcia, "Box of Rain" was the last song ever performed live at a Grateful Dead concert, during the final encore at Soldier Field in Chicago on July 9, 1995. Symbolically, it was the first song played at the first Fare Thee Well show at Soldier Field on July 3, 2015, bringing fans full circle.

Hunter recorded the song on his Jack O'Roses album (1980).

Reception 
In 2021, Rolling Stone ranked the song at number 364 in their updated list of the 500 Greatest Songs of All Time.

References

1970 songs
Grateful Dead songs
Songs written by Phil Lesh
Songs with lyrics by Robert Hunter (lyricist)